Montaldeo is a comune (municipality) in the Province of Alessandria in the Italian region Piedmont, located about  southeast of Turin and about  southeast of Alessandria.  

Montaldeo borders the following municipalities: Casaleggio Boiro, Castelletto d'Orba, Lerma, Mornese, Parodi Ligure, and San Cristoforo.

References

Cities and towns in Piedmont